A first quantization of a physical system is a possibly semiclassical treatment of quantum mechanics, in which particles or physical objects are treated using quantum wave functions but the surrounding environment (for example a potential well or a bulk electromagnetic field or gravitational field) is treated classically.

However, this need not be the case. In particular, a fully quantum version of the theory can be created by interpreting the interacting fields and their associated potentials as operators of multiplication, provided the potential is written in the canonical coordinates that are compatible with the Euclidean coordinates of standard classical mechanics. First quantization is appropriate for studying a single quantum-mechanical system (not to be confused with a single particle system, since a single quantum wave function describes the state of a single quantum system, which may have arbitrarily many complicated constituent parts, and whose evolution is given by just one uncoupled Schrödinger equation) being controlled by laboratory apparatuses that are governed by classical mechanics, for example an old fashion voltmeter (one devoid of modern semiconductor devices, which rely on quantum theory-- however though this is sufficient, it is not necessary), a simple thermometer, a magnetic field generator, and so on.

History 

Published in 1901, Max Planck deduced the existence and value of the constant now bearing his name from considering only Wien's displacement law, statistical mechanics, and electromagnetic theory. Four years later in 1905, Albert Einstein went further to elucidate this constant and its deep connection to the stopping potential of photons emitted in the photoelectric effect. The energy in the photoelectric effect depended not only on the number of incident photons (the intensity of light) but also the frequency of light, a novel phenomena at the time, which would earn Einstein the 1921 Nobel Prize in Physics. It can then be concluded that this was a key onset of quantization, that is the discretization of matter into fundamental constituents.

About eight years later Niels Bohr in 1913, published his famous three part series where, essentially by fiat, he posits the quantization of the angular momentum in hydrogen and hydrogen like metals. Where in effect, the orbital angular momentum  of the (valence) electron, takes the form , where  is presumed a whole number . See references above for more detail.

While it would be later shown that this assumption is not entirely correct, it in fact ends up being rather close to the correct expression for the orbital angular momentum operator's (eigenvalue) quantum number for large values of the quantum number , and indeed this was part of Bohr's own assumption. Without going into further historical detail, it suffices to stop here and regard this era of the history of quantization to be the "old quantum theory", meaning a period in the history of physics where the corpuscular nature of subatomic particles began to play an increasingly important role in understanding the results of physical experiments, whose mandatory conclusion was the discretization of key physical observable quantities. However, unlike the era below described as the era of first quantization, this era was based solely on purely classical arguments such as Wien's displacement law, thermodynamics, statistical mechanics, and the electromagnetic theory. In fact, the observation of the Balmer series of hydrogen in the history of spectroscopy dates as far back as 1885.

Nonetheless, the watershed events, which would come to denote the era of first quantization, took place in the vital years spanning 1925-1928. Simultaneously the authors Born and Jordan in December of 1925, together with Dirac also in December of 1925, then Schrodinger in January 1926, following that, Born, Heisenberg and Jordan in August 1926, and finally Dirac in 1928. The results of these publications were 3 theoretical formalisms 2 of which proved to be equivalent, that of Born, Heisenberg and Jordan was equivalent to that of Schrodinger, while Dirac's 1928 theory came to be regarded as the relativistic version of the prior two. Lastly, it is worth mentioning the publication of Heisenberg and Pauli in 1929, which can be regarded as the first attempt at "second quantization", a term used verbatim by Pauli in a 1943 publication of the American Physical Society.

For purposes of clarification and understanding of the terminology as it evolved over history, it suffices to end with the major publication that helped recognize the equivalence of the matrix mechanics of Born, Heisenberg, and Jordan 1925-1926 with the wave equation of Schrodinger in 1926. The collected and expanded works of John von Neumann showed that the two theories were mathematically equivalent, and it is this realization that is today understood as first quantization.

Qualitative mathematical preliminaries 

To understand the term first quantization one must first understand what it means for something to be quantum in the first place. The classical theory of Newton is a second order nonlinear differential equation that gives the deterministic trajectory of a system of mass, . The acceleration, in Newton's second law of motion, is the second derivative of the system's position as a function of time. Therefore, it is natural to seek solutions of the Newton equation that are at least second order differentiable.

Quantum theory differs dramatically in that it replaces physical observables such as the position of the system, the time at which that observation is made, the mass, and the velocity of the system at the instant of observation with the notion of operator observables. Operators as observables change the notion of what is measurable and brings to the table the unavoidable conclusion of the Max Born probability theory. In this framework of nondeterminism, the probability of finding the system in a particular observable state is given by a dynamic probability density that is defined as the absolute value squared of the solution to the Schrodinger equation. The fact that probability densities are integrable and normalizable to unity imply that the solutions to the Schrodinger equation must be square integrable. It is in one-to-one correspondence with the infinite dimensional vector space of square-integrable functions, from the Euclidean space  to the complex plane, . This is rather misleading because  is also a Hilbert space when equipped and completed under the Euclidean inner product, albeit a finite dimensional space.

Types of systems 

Both the Newton theory and the Schrodinger theory have a mass parameter in them and they can thus describe the evolution of a collection of masses or a single constituent system with a single total mass, as well as an idealized single particle with idealized single mass system. Below are examples of different types of systems.

One-particle systems

For example, the three quantum numbers  associated to an electron in a coulomb potential, like the hydrogen atom, form a complete set (ignoring spin). Hence, the state is called  and is an eigenvector of the Hamiltonian operator. One can obtain a state function representation of the state using . All eigenvectors of a Hermitian operator form a complete basis, so one can construct any state  obtaining the completeness relation:

Many have felt that all the properties of the particle could be known using this vector basis, which is expressed here using the Dirac Bra–ket notation. However this need not be true.

Many-particle systems

When turning to N-particle systems, i.e., systems containing N identical particles i.e. particles characterized by the same physical parameters such as mass, charge and spin, an extension of the single-particle state function  to the N-particle state function  is necessary. A fundamental difference between classical and quantum mechanics concerns the concept of indistinguishability of identical particles. Only two species of particles are thus possible in quantum physics, the so-called bosons and fermions which obey the rules:

 (bosons),

 (fermions).

Where we have interchanged two coordinates  of the state function. The usual wave function is obtained using the Slater determinant and the identical particles theory. Using this basis, it is possible to solve any many-particle problem that can be clearly and accurately described by a single wave function single system-wide diagonalizable state. From this perspective, first quantization is not a truly multi-particle theory but the notion of "system" need not consist of a single particle either.

See also 
 Canonical quantization
Geometric quantization
Quantization
 Second quantization

Notes

References 

Quantum mechanics